Vava Mario Yagalo (born 21 April 1993) is an Indonesian professional footballer who plays as a defender for Liga 1 club Persik Kediri.

Club career

Persija Jakarta
In 2015, Vava signed a contract with Persija Jakarta. He made his league debut on 4 April 2015 against Arema. On 8 June 2018, Vava scored his first goal for Persija against PS TIRA in the 1st minute at the Sultan Agung Stadium, Bantul.

TIRA-Persikabo
In 2019, Vava signed for TIRA-Persikabo. He made his debut on 18 May 2019 against Badak Lampung at the Pakansari Stadium, Cibinong.

Persik Kediri
In 2020, Vava joined Persik Kediri. He made his league debut on 29 February 2020 against Persebaya Surabaya at the Gelora Bung Tomo Stadium, Surabaya. This season was suspended on 27 March 2020 due to the COVID-19 pandemic in Indonesia. The season was abandoned and was declared void on 20 January 2021.

International career
Vava represented Indonesia at the 2008 AFC U-16 Championship. He scored his first goal against Syria on 4 October 2008.

Personal life
Vava was named after two Brazilian football legends, Vavá and Mário Zagallo, despite being a devout Muslim. He studied law at the University of Kediri.

Vava's father passed away on 29 June 2016 while he was training with his team.

Career statistics

Club

Honours

Club

Sriwijaya U-21
 Indonesia Super League U-21: 2012–13
Persija Jakarta
 Liga 1: 2018
 Indonesia President's Cup: 2018

References

External links 
 
 Vava Mario Yagalo at Liga Indonesia

1993 births
Living people
Indonesian footballers
Liga 1 (Indonesia) players
Persija Jakarta players
Persebaya Surabaya players
Bhayangkara F.C. players
Persikabo 1973 players
Persik Kediri players
Indonesia youth international footballers
Sportspeople from East Java
Association football defenders
People from Kediri (city)
Indonesian Muslims